Arun Peter Panchia (born 22 April 1989) is a former New Zealand field hockey player. He earned his first cap for the New Zealand men's national field hockey team in 2009 against Pakistan and retired from international hockey in 2020.

Playing Career 
Panchia's career spanned over eleven years amassing 287 international caps over his career, retiring as the fifth highest capped Men's Black Sticks player of all time. Panchia competed at the 2016 Summer Olympics in Rio De Janeiro, where the team finished seventh. He also competed at three Commonwealth Games and three Hockey World Cups, winning two Commonwealth Games medals, earning bronze at the 2010 Commonwealth Games in Delhi and silver at the 2018 Commonwealth Games in Gold Coast.

Panchia plays as a defensive midfielder for Auckland in the New Zealand National Hockey League and played in the Netherlands for a season at SCHC. Due to his commitments to the national team, Panchia returned to New Zealand missing the second half of the season.

Personal Life 
Panchia was born on 22 April 1989 in Auckland to Peter and Ramila Panchia. Both his parents played field hockey at local level. Panchia's siblings are also field hockey players; he is the eldest of four who have played representative hockey. Jared Panchia, represented the national team and Daniel Panchia has represented the national junior team. He has a younger sister, Anjali, who has also taken up the sport. The Panchia family have Gujarati ancestry, with Panchia's great-grandfather emigrating from India to New Zealand in the 1920s.

References

External links
 

1989 births
Living people
New Zealand male field hockey players
Olympic field hockey players of New Zealand
Male field hockey midfielders
Field hockey players at the 2016 Summer Olympics
2010 Men's Hockey World Cup players
2014 Men's Hockey World Cup players
2018 Men's Hockey World Cup players
Commonwealth Games medallists in field hockey
Commonwealth Games silver medallists for New Zealand
Commonwealth Games bronze medallists for New Zealand
Field hockey players at the 2010 Commonwealth Games
Field hockey players at the 2014 Commonwealth Games
Field hockey players at the 2018 Commonwealth Games
Field hockey players from Auckland
New Zealand sportspeople of Indian descent
Medallists at the 2010 Commonwealth Games
Medallists at the 2018 Commonwealth Games